The 2017 St. Petersburg Ladies' Trophy – Singles season began with Roberta Vinci (defending champion from the previous year) losing out in the quarterfinals to unseeded Kristina Mladenovic.

Mladenovic went on to win the season and achieve her first WTA singles title, defeating Yulia Putintseva in the final, 6–2, 6–7(3–7), 6–4.

Seeds
The top four seeds received a bye into the second round.

Draw

Finals

Top half

Bottom half

Qualifying

Seeds

Qualifiers

Lucky losers
 ''' Donna Vekić

Draw

First qualifier

Second qualifier

Third qualifier

Fourth qualifier

References
 Main draw
 Qualifying draw

St. Petersburg Ladies' Trophy - Women's Singles
St. Petersburg Ladies' Trophy